Ghanem Al-Saleh (March 13, 1943 - October 19, 2010) was a Kuwaiti actor.

Works

Dubbing 
Around the World with Willy Fog

References

1943 births
2010 deaths
Kuwaiti male actors
Kuwaiti male stage actors
Kuwaiti male film actors
20th-century Kuwaiti male actors
21st-century Kuwaiti male actors